The Bist (archaic) is a river in France and in Germany, and a  left tributary of the Saar.

The Bist begins near the French village of Boucheporn, Lorraine and flows northeastward to Creutzwald.

See also
List of rivers of Saarland

References

Rivers of Saarland
Rivers of Grand Est
Rivers of France
International rivers of Europe
Rivers of Moselle (department)
Rivers of Germany
France–Germany border
Border rivers